Glasswing International is an international non-profit, non-governmental organization (NGO) founded in 2007 in San Salvador, El Salvador, by Celina de Sola, Diego de Sola, and Ken Baker. Glasswing operates health, education, migration, and community development programs for children throughout Latin America and New York City.

History 
In 2007, Celina de Sola, a Salvadoran humanitarian worker and public health specialist, co-founded Glasswing International with her brother Diego and husband Ken Baker. Its mission is to curb the impact of poverty and violence in Latin America through public education, public health, and community development.

Glasswing is headquartered in San Salvador and New York City with offices in Colombia, Costa Rica, Dominican Republic, Guatemala, Honduras, Nicaragua, and Panama.

Overview  
Glasswing works in low-income communities where there are high rates of violence, dropout, and most youth have been raised by a single parent or relative other than their biological parents. Its partners in the public and private sectors include USAID, Chevron, Walmart Centroamérica, and Hanesbrands.

A 2016 study by the Pontifical Catholic University of Chile found that students enrolled in Glasswing's community schools showed improved academic performance, positive behavior changes, increased emotional resilience, and felt they had a better school environment.

References

External links 
  Glasswing International

Non-profit organizations based in El Salvador
Social economy
Organizations established in 2007